Carr High School, also known as Weddleville High School, is a historic high school building located at Weddleville in Carr Township, Jackson County, Indiana.  It was built in 1857, and is a simple two-story, brick, gable front building.  The building exhibits vernacular Federal / Greek Revival and Italianate style design elements.  It sits on a limestone foundation and measures 24 feet by 40 feet. The building remained in use as a school until 1934.

It was listed on the National Register of Historic Places in 2011.

References

High schools in Indiana
School buildings on the National Register of Historic Places in Indiana
Federal architecture in Indiana
Greek Revival architecture in Indiana
Italianate architecture in Indiana
School buildings completed in 1857
Buildings and structures in Jackson County, Indiana
National Register of Historic Places in Jackson County, Indiana
1857 establishments in Indiana